The Kiyevka (formerly Судзухе Sudzukhe) is a river in Primorsky Krai, Russia.

Kiyevka rises in Southern Sikhote-Alin and flows into the Kiyevka Bay of the Sea of Japan.

The river was named after Kyiv by settlers from Ukraine.

See also
Lazovsky District

Notes

Rivers of Primorsky Krai
Drainage basins of the Sea of Japan